Shinasha, also known as Boro (Borna, Bworo) is a North Omotic language spoken in western Ethiopia by the Shinasha people. Its speakers live in scattered areas north of the Abay River: in the Dangur, Bullen, Dibate and Wenbera districts, which are parts of the Benishangul-Gumuz Region.

Notes

References
 Lamberti, Marcello (1993) Die Shinassha-Sprache – Materialien zum Boro. Heidelberg. Universitätsverlag C. Winter.

Further reading 
 Franz Rottland (1990), "A sketch of Shinasha morphology", Omotic Language Studies, Richard Hayward (editor), pp. 185–209. London: SOAS.
 Idar Bergfjord (2013), Issues in Borna Phonology, MA thesis, University of Oslo

External links
 World Atlas of Language Structures information on Shinassha
 Website maintained by the language community, with published literature, including an online dictionary

Languages of Ethiopia
North Omotic languages